is a passenger railway station located in the city of Miyoshi, Tokushima Prefecture, Japan. It is operated by JR Shikoku and has the station number "D26".

Lines

Layout
The station, which is unstaffed, consists of two side platforms serving two tracks on a side hill cutting. From the main road (National Route 32, a flight of steps leads up to a small building which serves as a waiting room. Another short flight of steps leads up to one platform and a pedestrian level crossing is used to access the other platform. A small parking area is provided at the side of the main road.

Platforms

History
At this time the station was named  and was operated by Japanese Government Railways, later becoming Japanese National Railways (JNR). On 1 October 1950, the station was renamed Koboke Station.

With the privatization of JNR on 1 April 1987, control of the station passed to JR Shikoku.

Surrounding area
National Route 32 
Koboke Gorge

See also
 List of Railway Stations in Japan

References

External links

 JR Shikoku timetable

Railway stations in Tokushima Prefecture
Stations of Shikoku Railway Company
Railway stations in Japan opened in 1935
Miyoshi, Tokushima